Stolmy Ramón Pimentel (born February 1, 1990) is a Dominican former professional baseball pitcher. He played in Major League Baseball (MLB) for the Pittsburgh Pirates and the Texas Rangers.

Professional career

Boston Red Sox
He was signed by the Red Sox as an international free agent on July 2, 2006 as a 16-year-old by then Boston Scout Luis Scheker. He made his debut the next season with the DSL Red Sox, going 3-1 with a 2.90 ERA in 13 starts. He made the trip to America for the 2008 season, playing it with Low-A Lowell, going 5-2 with a 3.14 ERA in 11 starts. He played 2009 with Single-A Greenville, going 10-7 with a 3.82 ERA in 23 starts. He played 2010 with High-A Salem going 9-11 with a 4.06 ERA in 26 starts. Despite the worst season of his short career, he was nominated to the All-Star Futures Game facing 2 batters, Logan Morrison and Danny Espinosa, retiring them both. In the offseason, Pimentel signed a one-year, $414,000 deal, protecting him from the Rule V Draft. He started 2011 with Double-A Portland, but he went 0-9 with a 9.12 ERA in 15 starts, leading to a demotion back to Salem. He finished the season 6-13 with a 6.79 ERA in 25 starts.

Pittsburgh Pirates
On December 26, 2012 the Red Sox traded him (along with Mark Melancon, Jerry Sands and Iván DeJesús Jr.) to the Pittsburgh Pirates for Brock Holt and Joel Hanrahan. He made his MLB debut on September 4, 2013 for the Pirates. He pitched out of the bullpen, and made five appearances in 2013. Pimentel started the 2014 season on the Pirates Opening Day roster.

Pimentel was designated for assignment by the Pirates on April 5, 2015.

Texas Rangers
The Texas Rangers claimed Pimentel on waivers on April 11, 2015.

New York Mets
On November 24, 2015, Pimentel signed a minor league deal with the New York Mets. He was released on June 6, 2016.

Guerreros de Oaxaca
On July 7, 2016, Pimentel signed with the Guerreros de Oaxaca of the Mexican Baseball League. He was released on September 23, 2016.

Scouting report
Pimentel has 4 pitches: a four-seam fastball, a 12-6 curveball, a changeup and a two-seam cut fastball. His four-seamer ranges from 92-95, his cutter is 89-92, his curve around the low 70s, and his changeup around 78-82. He is an aggressive pitcher.

References

External links
, or Retrosheet
Pelota Binaria (Venezuelan Baseball League)

1990 births
Living people
Altoona Curve players
Bradenton Marauders players
Dominican Republic expatriate baseball players in Mexico
Dominican Republic expatriate baseball players in the United States
Dominican Summer League Red Sox players
Estrellas Orientales players
Greenville Drive players
Guerreros de Oaxaca players
Indianapolis Indians players
Las Vegas 51s players
Lowell Spinners players
Major League Baseball pitchers
Major League Baseball players from the Dominican Republic
Mexican League baseball pitchers
Navegantes del Magallanes players
People from San Cristóbal Province
Pittsburgh Pirates players
Portland Sea Dogs players
Round Rock Express players
Salem Red Sox players
Texas Rangers players
Dominican Republic expatriate baseball players in Venezuela
Dominican Republic expatriate baseball players in Colombia